Skyllingsheia is a neighbourhood in the city of Kristiansand in Agder county, Norway.  It is located in the borough of Vågsbygd and in the district of Vågsbygd. Skyllingsheia is north of the neighborhood of Auglandsbukta, south of Lumber, and east of central Vågsbygd.

Transport

References

Geography of Kristiansand
Neighbourhoods of Kristiansand